2M0437 b, or 2MASS J04372171+2651014 b, is an extrasolar planet that orbits the red dwarf of the pre-main sequence 2MASS J04372171+2651014, 418 light-years away in the constellation of Taurus. It is a gas giant, with a mass 4 times that of Jupiter. It is one of the few exoplanets directly imaged. The planet is of importance to astronomers as it challenges models of planet formation by nucleus accretion and disk instability.

Star 
The host star is a low mass red dwarf star (a mass of 0.15-0.18 solar masses) that belongs to the pre-main sequence with a temperature of 3100 K. Although K2 detected a quasiperiodic dimming of nearby circumstellar dust, the star it lacks an excess infrared emission detectable from a circumstellar disk and its Hα emission is not proportional to accretion. There is also evidence of a second extremely faint object 75 arc-seconds apart that is possibly linked to the star.

Discovery 
2MASS J0437 b was first observed in March 2018 in images from the Subaru Telescope. The observations required three years to confirm that the observed object was not a background star since the star has a very slow apparent movement across the sky.

Characteristics 
It is a super-Jupiter-type planet with a mass of 4 or 5 times that of Jupiter, at a distance of 118 AU from its star and an age between 2 and 5 million years. It is one of the youngest planets discovered. Together with their star they belong to a 1 to 5 million year old Taurus star formation region. Its effective temperature of ~ 1450 K gives it a spectrum of the L8-9 spectral type.

References

Exoplanets detected by direct imaging
Gas giants